Dichomeris dicausta is a moth in the family Gelechiidae. It was described by Edward Meyrick in 1913. It is found in Assam, India.

The forewings are slaty fuscous with a narrow fulvous-brown streak along the costa from the middle to near the apex, its costal edge dark fuscous. There are irregular narrow fulvous-brown streaks above and below the middle from near the base to two-fifths. The plical and second discal stigmata are represented by a few green-whitish scales, the latter preceded by a short obscure oblique longitudinal streak of fulvous brown suffusion. The hindwings are dark fuscous.

References

Moths described in 1913
dicausta